Doreen Agnes Rosemary Julia Warriner  (16March 190417December 1972) was a development economist born in Long Compton, Warwickshire, England (now in Stratford-on-Avon district). In October 1938, she journeyed to Czechoslovakia to assist anti-Nazi refugees fleeing the Sudetenland, recently occupied by Germany. She became the head of the British Committee for Refugees from Czechoslovakia in Prague which helped 15,000 German, Czech, and Jewish refugees escape Czechoslovakia while the country was being occupied and annexed by Nazi Germany in 1938 and 1939. Told that she would be arrested by the Germans Warriner departed Czechoslovakia on 23 April 1939. Britain awarded her an OBE (Officer of the Most Excellent Order of the British Empire) in 1942.

Early life
Warriner's parents were Henry Arthur Warriner (1859–1927), a land agent for Weston Park, Long Compton, and his wife Henrietta Beatrice (1876–1953), daughter of Thomas McNulty, a Church of England clergyman of a slum parish in the Staffordshire Black Country, who had left Ireland.

Warriner was educated at Malvern Girls' College, then at St Hugh's College, Oxford, where she obtained a first in PPE. After a period of postgraduate study at London School of Economics, she went on to receive a doctorate from Somerville College, Oxford in 1931, as a Mary Somerville Research Fellow since 1928. Warriner was described as a "staunch feminist and internationalist with an interest in communism."  She was investigated by the British security agency, MI5, between 1938 and 1952 for her suspected communist contacts, but apparently no adverse information was recorded. Most of her published work was about small-scale peasant farming and land reform.

Rescuing Czech refugees

In the Munich Agreement of 30 September 1938 Czechoslovakia ceded the Sudetenland region of the country to Nazi Germany. Fearing Nazi oppression, anti-Nazi socialists, communists, and social democrats fled the Sudetenland for the still-independent parts of Czechoslovakia along with anti-Nazis from Germany itself. The anti-Jewish pogrom of Kristallnacht in Germany on 9–10 November 1938 stimulated many Jews to flee Germany and Czechoslovakia was one destination. In late 1938 there were about 200,000 German, Sudeten, and Jewish refugees in Czechoslovakia.

Warriner arrived in Prague by air on 13 October 1938 with 450 pounds sterling donated to her to assist the refugees. She found a chaotic situation in Prague and an anticipation, soon realized, that the Nazis would take over the whole country. She made contact with the Society of Friends and a number of other humanitarian organizations, but quickly realized that her first priority was not relief, but getting people vulnerable to Nazi oppression out of Czechoslovakia.  Together with Welsh politician David Grenfell and Sudetenland leader Siegfried Taub, she made a list of the 250 most vulnerable refugees, all men, in Czechoslovakia and Grenfell returned to England to attempt to gain permission for them to take refuge in Britain. Grenfell quickly obtained permission for the refugees to be admitted into Britain, but with no provision for taking their families with them. Warriner supervised the departure of the men from Czechoslovakia by train to Poland from where they continued onward to Britain.  Warriner's main focus was on rescuing anti-Nazi political refugees for resettlement.

In November, Warriner turned some of her attention to the squalid refugee camps scattered in the countryside around Prague. In late November, journalist Walter Layton visited Czechoslovakia and appointed her as the representative of the British Committee for Refugees from Czechoslovakia (BCRC) with a budget of 7,000 pounds and a staff consisting of a small band of women. On 12 December, the Daily Telegraph published a letter by her. She criticized British relief efforts and the ineffectual response of British citizenry to the Czech crisis. She was reprimanded for the letter by a BCRC official who estimated that the letter cost the BCRC 10,000 pounds in potential donations. In January 1939, the governments of France and the United Kingdom acknowledged the refugee crisis by pledging 12 million pounds for the cost of resettling Czech refugees. Canada agreed to finance and resettle 1,000 Sudetens.

Warriner, several key colleagues, and a large number of foreign and Czech humanitarian organizations were then in a race to get as many Czech refugees as possible out of the country before the anticipated German takeover. British authorizations of visas for Czechs only trickled in, however, and she flew to Britain in late January and got permission to evacuate immediately 600 families and to speed up the bureaucratic procedures for Czech refugees to go to Britain. On 15 March, German troops marched into Czechoslovakia and took control of the whole country. By the end of March, German authorities began refusing exit visas for Czechs, especially communists, although not hindering the departure of Jewish children. The German crackdown stimulated a large market in forged passports and exit documents in which Warriner was probably involved. Warriner's close associate at the British Legation in Prague, diplomat Robert J. Stopford, continued to seek legal authorization from the Germans for refugees to leave Czechoslovakia while Warriner and her associates smuggled out refugees with forged documents mostly by train through Poland, while hiding hundreds of threatened people, mostly women, in shabby hotels.

On 14 April, the German Gestapo raided Warriner's office. She was not there but a Canadian Quaker worker, Beatrice Wellington, was detained and questioned. Stopford told Warriner that the Germans planned to arrest her and advised her to leave Czechoslovakia immediately and on 23 April Warriner departed.  Wellington was appointed to replace her as the representative of the BCRC in Prague. Stopford estimated that Warriner and her colleagues in the BCRC, including those who remained in the country after her departure, facilitated the departure of 15,000 refugees from Czechoslovakia in 1938 and 1939, most of whom were resettled in Britain.

Later life
Britain awarded Warriner an OBE (Officer of the Most Excellent Order of the British Empire) in 1942.

During World War II, Warriner worked for the Minister of Economic Warfare in Britain and Egypt and in 1944–1946 headed the food-supply division of the United Nations Relief and Rehabilitation Administration's Yugoslavian mission. She returned to academic life in 1947–1961 at the University of London's UCL School of Slavonic and East European Studies. She wrote favorably of the communist revolutions in eastern Europe after the war. Land Reform was a major focus of her academic work but by 1969 she had changed her views  to endorse the need for individual land ownership and credit and criticized communism for ignoring economics in favor of getting "peasants under control."

Doreen Warriner died on 17 December 1972 after suffering a stroke. The memoir of her work in Czechoslovakia, "Winter in Prague," was published posthumously in 1984.

Selected publications
Economic Problems of Peasant Farming (1939)
Food and Farming in Postwar Europe (1943)
Land and Poverty in the Middle East (1948)
First report on progress in land reform compiled for the United Nations (1954)
Land Reform in Principle and Practice (1969)
 "Winter in Prague" (1984),

References

Further reading

1904 births
1972 deaths
Members of the Fabian Society
People from Stratford-on-Avon District
Alumni of St Hugh's College, Oxford
Alumni of Somerville College, Oxford
Fellows of Somerville College, Oxford
British humanitarians
Kindertransport